Jack Dawkins, better known as the Artful Dodger, is a character in Charles Dickens's 1838 novel Oliver Twist. The Dodger is a pickpocket, so called for his skill and cunning in that occupation. He is the leader of the gang of child criminals on the streets of London, trained by the elderly Fagin. The term has become an idiom describing a person with skilful deception.

Role in the novel

In the novel, he becomes Oliver's closest friend (although he betrays Oliver when Oliver is caught) and he tries to make him a pickpocket, but soon realises that Oliver will not succeed, and feels sorry for him, saying "What a pity it is he isn't a prig!" He also has a close relationship with Charley Bates. The Artful Dodger is characterised as a child who acts like an adult. He is described as wearing adult clothes which are much too large for him. Like an adult, he seldom gives in to childish urges.

Ultimately the Dodger is caught with a stolen silver snuff box and presumably transported from England to a penal colony in Australia (only alluded to in the novel). The absurdity of the master pickpocket being caught over something so small is remarked upon in the book:

The Dodger chooses to consider himself a "victim of society", roaring in the courtroom, "I am an Englishman, ain't I? Where are my priwileges?" The jailer tells him "You'll get your privileges soon enough", while the judge has little patience for the Dodger's posturing, and orders him out of the courtroom immediately after the jury convicts him of the theft. Dickens describes him this way:

Dickens had first used a similar term in his previous novel, The Pickwick Papers. At the close of Chapter 16, Sam Weller refers to the recent schemes of Mr Jingle: "Reg'lar do, sir; artful dodge."

The Artful Dodger, though a pickpocket, is not a heartless character. He has a great respect for Fagin – "There ain't no teacher like Fagin!" (chapter 3) – to whom he delivers all of the pickpocketing spoils without question.

Actors who have played the role 

The role of the Artful Dodger has been played by several notable performers. Anthony Newley played the character in a 1948 film adaptation of the story. The role was amplified in the musical Oliver!. The part was first played by Martin Horsey, and later by Tony Robinson, Davy Jones, Leonard Whiting, Steve Marriott, and Phil Collins.  Elijah Wood also portrayed the character in the 1997 television film, which aired as part of The Wonderful World of Disney on ABC. He was played by Harry Eden in Roman Polanski's big-budget 2005 film version.

For the BBC TV serial, Melvyn Hayes portrayed the character, which is considered to be very faithful to the book's original depiction of him. In the 1968 film Oliver!, Jack Wild played the role and was nominated for an Academy Award for Best Supporting Actor. In the BBC adaptation of Oliver Twist in 2007, he is played by Adam Arnold. In the 2021 film Twist, Rita Ora plays the role.

Others to have played the role in amateur productions include Adam Levine, Ben Elton, Robbie Williams, Joe Jonas, Claire Josefson, and Hayley Smith.

Cultural influences 
In the 1980 ATV series The Further Adventures of Oliver Twist, the Dodger was played by John Fowler. When Oliver is sent by Mr Brownlow to a boarding school, he finds the Dodger already there, and it is revealed that thanks to Oliver's uncle Harry Maylie the Dodger escaped transportation and was instead enrolled in the school. The two friends re-unite, and when Oliver flees the school the Dodger follows him back to London. Oliver is made to believe, by Noah Claypole, Noah's girlfriend Charlotte, and Mrs Carraway (Mr Brownlow's corrupt new housekeeper), that Mr Brownlow is ill to the point of death. After Dodger rescues Oliver from his imprisonment by Claypole in the Brownlow cellar, he and Oliver are forced to take to the streets to uncover the truth, encountering Mr Bumble, the villainous Monks, and their old mentor Fagin along the way. In Peter F. Hamilton's Void Trilogy, Aaron pilots a spaceship called the Artful Dodger.

Argentine football player and 1986 FIFA World Cup winning captain Diego Maradona was frequently referred to as the Artful Dodger due to his cunning personality and ability to get away with fouls, such as disguising the illegal use of his hand, as he infamously did when scoring with the "Hand of God".

At least two different books about the Major League Baseball club known as the "Dodgers" have used this character's name as a play-on-words for their titles: The Artful Dodgers, edited by Tom Meany; and The Artful Dodger, by Tommy Lasorda with David Fisher.

Condredge Holloway, the quarterback for the University of Tennessee Volunteers (1972–74), was known as "The Artful Dodger" for his scrambling prowess and elusive manner. Holloway was the first African-American starting quarterback in the history of Southeastern Conference football, went on to star in the Canadian Football League from 1975 through 1987, and was inducted into the Canadian Football Hall of Fame in 1999.

Dodger is one of the characters in Shadowrun, an elven hacker; his romantic involvement with semi-autonomous knowbot Morgan spurs her into full self-consciousness and turns her into one of the setting's first true AIs, launching a far-reaching chain of events that still largely define the metaplot twenty in-character (fifteen real) years later.

In the Bewitched episode, "The Phrase is Familiar", Tabitha's tutor uses witchcraft to make the Artful Dodger come out of Oliver Twist. In this episode he steals Samantha's ring, Darrin's watch, and the cufflinks of a client of Darrin's advertising company.

The literary magazine Artful Dodge was named after the character.

In an episode of Gilmore Girls, "Nick & Nora, Sid & Nancy", Rory calls Jess "Dodger" after he steals her book.

In the Lost Girl episode "It's Better to Burn Out Than Fade Away", a character refers to himself as being the "Artful Dodger" for his artist friend. Bo suggests that he did not actually read Oliver Twist.

In the 1986 animated film An American Tail, Tony Toponi, a streetwise teenage mouse of Italian descent, has similarities to the Artful Dodger.

The character of Adric in the science-fiction TV series Doctor Who was originally envisioned as an Artful Dodger-style character.

Modern interpretations
In Walt Disney's 1988 animated feature film version of Oliver Twist, Oliver and Company, the character of the Artful Dodger was changed to a streetwise mutt simply named Dodger. The voice was provided by musician Billy Joel.

In 1996, Jean Loup Wolfman played the role in an adaptation by Seth Michael Donsky entitled Twisted. The film is set in a contemporary New York City underground populated by drag queens, drug abusers and hustlers. The Artful Dodger is a gay rent boy and hustler called Arthur, better known among his clientele as "Fine Art". He befriends the Oliver Twist character called Lee (played by Keivyn McNeill Grayes), the latter a black adolescent runaway.

In the first edition of Alan Moore and Kevin O'Neill's comic series League of Extraordinary Gentlemen, set in 1898 London, the Dodger briefly appears as an elderly man running his own gang of boy thieves, hinting that he is still following in Fagin's footsteps.

In 2001, the Artful Dodger was the subject of an Australian children's show called Escape of the Artful Dodger. The show followed the Artful Dodger's adventures in the Australian penal colony in New South Wales, as well as his eventual redemption. Oliver Twist and Fagin also appeared.

In the 2003 film Twist, the Artful Dodger is called Dodge and is played by Nick Stahl. The film is told from his point of view, in which he is a drug addict influenced by Fagin.

In the 2010 Doctor Who audio drama Legend of the Cybermen, the Artful Dodger is one of the characters seen in the land of fiction. He was voiced by Steven Kynman.

In Tony Lee's 2011 novel Dodge & Twist, set twelve years after the events of Oliver Twist, Dodger has returned to England a changed man from his time in Australia, and is planning a heist. However he cannot escape the 'ghost' of Fagin, who still guides his actions, even past the grave.

In Terry Pratchett's 2012 novel Dodger, the title character bears certain similarities to the Dickens character. The sampler of the book also includes him meeting an astute gentleman who concerns himself with the well-being of the poor called Charlie Dickens.

A 2014 novel by Peter David, Artful, features the Artful Dodger as the main character, and depicts his life following the events of Oliver Twist, which includes confrontations with vampires, one of whom is revealed to be Fagin. The storyline of that novel was continued in a comic book series of the same name.

In the late 2015 BBC series Dickensian, the Artful Dodger is portrayed by Wilson Radjou-Pujalte.

In the 2022 CBBC series, Dodger, the Artful Dodger is portrayed by Billy Jenkins.

References

External links 
 Artful Dodger on IMDb

Oliver Twist characters
Literary archetypes by name
Fictional orphans
Fictional convicts transported to Australia
Child characters in musical theatre
Literary characters introduced in 1838
Child characters in film
Child characters in literature
Child characters in television
Fictional thieves
Fictional people from the 19th-century
Fictional people from London
Male characters in film
Male characters in literature
Male characters in television